C4D may refer to:
 Complement component 4d.
 Animation Software Cinema 4D.
 Communication for Development